Ivanovka is a rural locality (a selo) in Verkh-Kuchuksky Selsoviet, Shelabolikhinsky District, Altai Krai, Russia. The population was 265 as of 2013. There are 4 streets.

Geography 
Ivanovka is located 35 km west of Shelabolikha (the district's administrative centre) by road. Verkh-Kuchuk is the nearest rural locality.

References 

Rural localities in Shelabolikhinsky District